Kon Rẫy is a rural district of Kon Tum province in the Central Highlands region of Vietnam. National Road 24 passes through the district. As of 2003 the district had a population of 22,872. The district covers an area of 891 km². The district capital lies at Đăk Rve.

References

Districts of Kon Tum province